Maria Stanisława Kurowska (born 3 June 1954) is a Polish politician. She was elected to the Sejm (9th term) representing the constituency of Krosno.

References 

Living people
1954 births
Place of birth missing (living people)
21st-century Polish politicians
21st-century Polish women politicians
Members of the Polish Sejm 2019–2023
Women members of the Sejm of the Republic of Poland